The following is a list of notable faculty, trustees, and alumni of Phillips Exeter Academy, a preparatory school in Exeter, New Hampshire, founded in 1781.

Notable faculty members and trustees of Phillips Exeter Academy

John Phillips – founder of Phillips Exeter; president of board of trustees 1781–1795
John Pickering – federal judge, impeached for drunkenness; trustee 1781–1782
Paine Wingate – New Hampshire delegate to the Continental Congress; U.S. representative from New Hampshire; U.S. senator from New Hampshire; trustee 1787–1809
Benjamin Abbot – principal 1788–1838
Nicholas Emery – judge on the Maine Supreme Judicial Court; assistant teacher 1797
Gideon Lane Soule – principal 1838–1873
Daniel Dana – president of Dartmouth College; instructor 1789–91; board of trustees 1809–1843
John Taylor Gilman – delegate to the Continental Congress; Governor of New Hampshire; president of board of trustees 1795–1827
Ashur Ware – federal judge; instructor 1804–1805
Nathan Hale – editor and publisher; introduced regular editorial commentary; instructor 1805–1807
Alexander Hill Everett – diplomat and politician; assistant teacher 1807
Nathan Lord – president of Dartmouth College; faculty 1809–1812
Henry Ware Jr. – mentor to Ralph Waldo Emerson; instructor, 1812–1814
James Walker – president of Harvard University; faculty 1814–1815
William Bourne Oliver Peabody – minister and author; assistant instructor 1817
Ebenezer Adams – first professor of mathematics and natural philosophy
Nathaniel Appleton Haven – U.S. representative from New Hampshire; president of board of trustees 1828–1830
Jeremiah Smith – U.S. representative from New Hampshire; judge; Governor of New Hampshire; president of board of trustees 1830–1842
Francis Bowen – philosopher, writer, and educationalist; faculty 1833–1835 
Joseph Gibson Hoyt – chancellor of Washington University in St. Louis; faculty 1840–1858 
Andrew Preston Peabody – Unitarian clergyman and author; board of trustees, 1843–1885
Amos Tuck – U.S. representative from New Hampshire; founder of the Republican Party; board of trustees 1853–1879
Robert Franklin Pennell – scholar and classicist; faculty 1871–1882
Albert C. Perkins – principal 1873–1883
Charles H. Bell – Governor of New Hampshire; trustee 1879–1883 
George Lyman Kittredge – faculty 1883–1887 
Walter Quincy Scott – president of Ohio State University; principal 1884–1889 
Charles Everett Fish – principal 1890–1895 
Harlan P. Amen – principal 1895–1913 
T.A. Dwight Jones – faculty
H. Hamilton "Hammy" Bissell – director of scholarships
Robert H. Bates – mountaineer; faculty
Lewis Perry – principal 1914–1946
William Ernest Gillespie – Latin instructor 1939–1967, vice principal, dean of faculty, interim principal 1963–1964
William Saltonstall – principal 1946–1963
Donald B. Cole – historian; faculty 1947–1988
Dandridge MacFarlan Cole – American aerospace engineer, futurist, lecturer, and author; faculty 1949–1953, physics and astronomy
Winthrop Jordan – historian; faculty member in history department 1955–1960
Frederick Buechner – writer; theologian; Religion and English faculty and School Minister 1958–1967 
Cabot Lyford – sculptor; faculty 1963–1986
Richard W. Day – principal 1964–1973
Michael S. Greco – president of American Bar Association; faculty 1965–1968
George Crowe – ice hockey coach; faculty 1969–1975
David P. Robbins – mathematician; faculty 1972–1977
Dolores Kendrick – Poet Laureate of the District of Columbia; faculty 1972–1993
Stephen G. Kurtz – historian; principal 1974–1987
Kendra Stearns O'Donnell – painter; principal 1987–1997 
Tyler Tingley – principal 1997–2009 
Thomas Hassan – faculty 1989–present; principal 2009–2015
Dan Brown – New York Times bestselling author; faculty 1993
Michael Golay – historian; faculty 1999–present
Gwynneth Coogan – U.S. Olympian; faculty 2002–present
Todd Hearon – faculty 2003–present
Olutoyin Augustus – Nigerian hurdler; instructor in physical education 2011–2021
Thomas W. Simpson – faculty 2008–present
Lisa MacFarlane – principal 2015–2018
Willie Perdomo – current instructor in English

Notable alumni

1780s 

Benjamin Ives Gilman (c. 1783) – Ohio pioneer
George Sullivan (c. 1783) – U.S. representative from New Hampshire
Nathaniel Thayer (c. 1783) – Unitarian minister
Daniel Tilton (c. 1783) – one of the first three judges in Mississippi Territory, Supreme Court of Mississippi Territory
Josiah Bartlett Jr. (c. 1784) – U.S. representative from New Hampshire
Samuel Smith (c. 1784) – U.S. representative from New Hampshire
George B. Upham (c. 1785) – U.S. representative from New Hampshire
Daniel Meserve Durell (c. 1789) – U.S. representative from New Hampshire; member of Democratic-Republican Party

1790s

Dudley Leavitt (1790) – publisher, writer, teacher
David L. Morril (1790) – U.S. senator from New Hampshire, Governor of New Hampshire
Nicholas Emery (c. 1791) – judge on the Maine Supreme Judicial Court
John Noyes (1791) – U.S. representative from Vermont
Lewis Cass (1792) – brigadier general; Governor of Michigan Territory, U.S. Secretary of War; U.S. senator from Michigan; U.S. Secretary of State; Democratic candidate for president 
William Ladd (1793) – pacifist, founder and first president of American Peace Society
Nathaniel Upham (1793) – U.S. representative from New Hampshire
Samuel Conner (1794) – U.S. representative from Massachusetts
John Adams Harper (c. 1794) – U.S. representative from New Hampshire
Edward Little (1794) – attorney, entrepreneur, philanthropist
Joseph Stevens Buckminster (1795) – Unitarian minister and promulgator of Higher Criticism
Daniel Webster (1796) – U.S. representative who represented New Hampshire and Massachusetts; U.S. senator from Massachusetts; U.S. Secretary of State; diplomat
Leverett Saltonstall I (1798) – U.S. representative from Massachusetts

1800s

Samuel Livermore (1800) – legal scholar
Richard Saltonstall Rogers  (1800) – East Indies merchant, N. L. Rogers & Bros., Salem, Massachusetts
Abiel Chandler (1802) – merchant, philanthropist
Joseph Cogswell (1802) – educator, editor, library administrator
William Plumer Jr. (1802) – U.S. representative from New Hampshire
James Carr (1803) – U.S. representative from Massachusetts
John Perkins Cushing (1803) – China merchant, opium smuggler, philanthropist 
Augustine Heard (c. 1803) – entrepreneur and businessman
Nicholas B. Doe (1804) – U.S. representative from New York State
Theodore Lyman (1804) – Mayor of Boston, Massachusetts 
Lucius Manlius Sargent (1804) – author, antiquarian, and temperance advocate
John Lauris Blake (1806) – minister and prolific author
Benjamin T. Pickman (1806) – president of the Massachusetts State Senate
Zachariah Allen (1807) – manufacturer and inventor
Joseph Blunt (1807) – author; editor; politician; New York County District Attorney
Edward Everett (1807) – U.S. representative from Massachusetts; U.S. senator from Massachusetts; Governor of Massachusetts, ambassador to Great Britain; U.S. Secretary of State; president of Harvard University
Nathaniel Appleton Haven (1807) – U.S. representative from New Hampshire
Benjamin Kendrick Pierce (1807) – U.S. Army officer; brother of Franklin Pierce; son of Benjamin Pierce
James H. Duncan (1808) – U.S. representative from Massachusetts
James Freeman Dana (1809) – chemist; science author
Samuel Luther Dana (1809) – chemist; agricultural science specialist; science author
William Thorndike (1809) – president of the Massachusetts State Senate

1810s

John Sherburne Sleeper (1807) – sailor, ship master, novelist, journalist, politician
William Willis (1808) – Mayor of Portland, Maine; railroad president
Thomas Bulfinch (1810) – author of Bulfinch's Mythology
John Adams Dix (1810) – U.S. Secretary of the Treasury; U.S. Senator from New York; Governor of New York; U.S. Minister to France; Railroad President
Horace Hooker (1810) – Congregationalist minister; author
William Robinson (benefactor) (ca. 1810), school founder
Jonathan P. Cushing (1811) – president of Hampden-Sydney College
George Bancroft (1811) – historian, Secretary of the Navy; founder of the United States Naval Academy; ambassador to the United Kingdom
John G. Palfrey (1811) – clergyman, U.S. representative from Massachusetts 
Jared Sparks (1811) – president of Harvard University
Benjamin Ogle Tayloe – businessman
David Barker Jr. (1812) – U.S. representative from New Hampshire
Alpheus Spring Packard Sr. (1812) – professor; acting president of Bowdoin College
William Bourne Oliver Peabody (1812) – Unitarian minister, author
Charles Paine (1813) – Governor of Vermont
Samuel Edmund Sewall (1813) — lawyer; politician; abolitionist; suffragist 
James Wilson II (1813) – U.S. representative from New Hampshire
Andrew Leonard Emerson (1814) – first mayor of Portland, Maine
Gideon Lane Soule (1816) – principal of Phillips Exeter, 1838–1873
Nathaniel Gookin Upham (1816) – associate justice of the New Hampshire Supreme Court; railroad president; diplomat
George Lunt (1818) – politician, author, editor, poet
John Dennison Russ (1818) – physician; innovator in the education of the blind
Jonathan Chapman (1819) – Mayor of Boston, Massachusetts
Thomas Wilson Dorr (1819) – Governor of Rhode Island; leader of the eponymous Dorr Rebellion
Alfred L. Elwyn (1819) – humanitarian, author
Russell Sturgis (1819) – merchant, banker

1820s

John Parker Hale (1820) – U.S. representative from New Hampshire; U.S. senator from New Hampshire; abolitionist; Free Soil candidate for U.S. president; ambassador to Spain
Franklin Pierce (1820) – U.S. representative from New Hampshire; U.S. senator from New Hampshire; 14th president of the United States
Alpheus Felch (1821) – U.S. senator from Michigan; Governor of Michigan
Josiah S. Little (1821) – Speaker of the Maine House of Representatives 
Ephraim Peabody (1821) – Unitarian minister; abolitionist 
John Langdon Sibley (1821) – Librarian of Harvard University
Alfred W. Craven (1822) – civil engineer; founding member and president of the American Society of Civil Engineers
Thomas Tingey Craven (1822) – Rear Admiral, United States Navy
Samuel Foster Haven (1822) – archeologist, anthropologist
Richard Hildreth (1823) – historian, political theorist
John Hodgdon (1823) – president of the Maine State Senate; Mayor of Dubuque, Iowa
Forrest Shepherd (1823) – geologist
George Bradburn (1824) – politician and Unitarian minister in Massachusetts
Francis Ormand Jonathan Smith (c. 1824) – U.S. representative from Maine
Edward Henry Durell (1826) – Mayor of New Orleans, federal judge
Henry Francis Harrington (1828) – editor of the Boston Herald
Theodore Howard McCaleb (1828) – federal judge; president of the University of Louisiana
Francis Bowen (1829) – philosopher, writer, educationalist
 Benjamin Butler (1829) – Civil War general (Union); U.S. representative from Massachusetts; Governor of Massachusetts
 Edward Fox (1829) – federal judge
 Timothy Roberts Young (1829) – U.S. representative from Illinois
Charles Turner Torrey (1829) – abolitionist; convicted of stealing slaves, died in prison
Jeffries Wyman (1829) – naturalist and anatomist
Morrill Wyman (1829) – physician and social reformer

1830s

Henry Gardner (1831) – Governor of Massachusetts
Horace G. Hutchins (1831) – Mayor of Charlestown, Massachusetts
William Henry Chandler (1832) – politician from Connecticut
Edmund Burke Whitman (1833) – quartermaster, U.S. Army; superintendent of National Cemeteries
Nathaniel B. Baker (1834) – Governor of New Hampshire
Charles Jervis Gilman (1835) – U.S. representative from Maine
Fitz John Porter (1835) – Civil War general (Union)
John F. Potter (1835) – U.S. representative from Wisconsin
William B. Small (c. 1835) – U.S. representative from New Hampshire
Ezra Abbot (1836) – New Testament scholar
Amos Tappan Akerman (1836) – U.S. Attorney General, 1870–1872
Charles H. Bell (1837) – U.S. senator from New Hampshire, Governor of New Hampshire
Augustus Lord Soule (1837) – associate justice of Massachusetts Supreme Judicial Court
E. Carleton Sprague (1839) – lawyer, politician, chancellor of the University of Buffalo

1840s

James Camp Tappan (1840) – Civil War general (CSA), Speaker of the Arkansas House of Representatives
Henry W. Cleaveland (1841) – architect
Paul A. Chadbourne (1842) – president of University of Wisconsin, Williams College, and University of Massachusetts
James Cooley Fletcher (1842) – missionary, diplomat, author
Jonathan Homer Lane (1842) – astronomer
Elijah B. Stoddard (1843) – Mayor of Worcester, Massachusetts
E. C. Banfield (1845) – U.S. representative from Massachusetts; Solicitor of the United States Treasury
Charles Cogswell Doe (1845) – Chief Justice of the New Hampshire Supreme Court 
William Fessenden Allen (1846) – Privy Councillor to King of Hawaii; chairman of the advisory council of the Provisional Government of Hawaii; member of the executive council of the Republic of Hawaii 
Curtis Coe Bean (1846) – delegate from the Territory of Arizona to the U.S. House of Representatives
George Francis Richardson (1846) – Massachusetts politician
William Dorsheimer (1847) – U.S. representative from New York; Lieutenant Governor of New York
Charles Franklin Dunbar (1847) – editor; political economist; dean of faculty, Harvard University; president of the American Economic Association
Richard Sylvester (1847) – journalist
William Robert Ware (1847) – architect, founder of architecture programs at MIT and Columbia University
Christopher Langdell (1848) – legal scholar, jurist and educator

1850s

Frederick Lothrop Ames (1851) – business magnate; art collector
Franklin Benjamin Sanborn (1851) – author, journalist, abolitionist
Uriah Smith (1851) – Seventh-day Adventist author and theologian
George Bates Nichols Tower (c. 1851) – civil and mechanical engineer; author 
Benjamin Smith Lyman (1852) – mining engineer, surveyor, linguist 
Benjamin F. Prescott (1852) – Governor of New Hampshire
Charles Pomeroy Otis (1855) – educator; author
Wheelock G. Veazey (1855) – justice of the Vermont Supreme Court; Medal of Honor recipient (Civil War: Gettysburg)
George E. Adams (1856) – U.S. representative from Illinois
Marcellus Bailey (1856) – patent attorney; worked on the patents for the telephone
Frank W. Hackett (1857) – Assistant Secretary of the United States Navy
Edward Rowland Sill (1857) – poet
George W. Atherton (1858) – president of Pennsylvania State University
William Ripley Brown (1858) – U.S. representative from Kansas
Charles Ezra Greene (1858) – civil engineer; author; first dean of the University of Michigan College of Engineering
Edward Tuck (1858) – banker, diplomat, philanthropist
George S. Morison (1859) – leading bridge designer
Henry B. Lovering (1859) – U.S. representative from Massachusetts

1860s

Jeremiah Curtin (1860) – translator of Native American and Slavic languages; folklorist
William M.R. French (1860) – first director of the Art Institute of Chicago
Robert Todd Lincoln (1860) – son of President Abraham Lincoln; U.S. Secretary of War; U.S. Minister to the United Kingdom
James Greeley Flanders (1861) – Wisconsin politician
Marshall Snow (1861) – acting chancellor of Washington University in St. Louis
John White Chadwick (1862) – Unitarian minister and writer
Augustus Van Wyck (1862) – Supreme Court justice from Brooklyn, New York
John E. Leonard (1863) – U.S. representative from Louisiana
Elisha B. Maynard (1863) – Mayor of Springfield, Massachusetts; associate justice of Massachusetts Superior Court
John Ames Mitchell (1863) – architect; writer; publisher, co-founder and president of Life magazine
George Thomas Tilden (1863) – architect
Wilmon W. Blackmar (1864) – Medal of Honor recipient (Civil War: Battle of Five Forks)
Charles Rufus Brown (1865) – Hebrew Bible scholar
Robert Hallowell Richards (1865) – mining engineer; metallurgist 
Joseph Lyman Silsbee (1865) – architect
William Gardner Hale (1866) – classical scholar
Edward R. Bacon (1867) – railroad president; financier; art collector
John Hubbard (1867) – Real Admiral, U.S. Navy
Herbert H. D. Peirce (1867) – diplomat; Third Assistant Secretary of State; U.S. Ambassador to Norway; brother of C. S. Peirce
Herbert Baxter Adams (1868) – educator and historian
Winfield Scott Edgerly (1868) – brigadier general, U.S. Army
Robert Franklin Pennell (1868) – educator and scholar
Charlemagne Tower Jr. (1868) – U.S. Ambassador to Russia and Germany
Frank O. Briggs (1869) – U.S. senator from New Jersey

1870s

August Belmont Jr. (1870) – banker; owner and breeder of thoroughbreds, builder of Belmont Park racetrack
Erastus Brainerd (1870) – museum curator; newspaper editor; publicist for Seattle, Washington
Nathan Haskell Dole (1870) – author and translator
Ulysses S. Grant Jr. (c. 1870) – entrepreneur; son of President Ulysses S. Grant
Samuel L. Powers (1870) – U.S. representative from Massachusetts
Sylvester Primer (1870) – linguist and philologist
Albert D. Bosson (1871) – Mayor of Chelsea, Massachusetts
Nelson Taylor Jr. (1871) – politician from Connecticut
Philip Hale (1872) – music critic
Oscar Richard Hundley (1872) – federal judge
Frank H. Pope (1872) – newspaper reporter; Massachusetts politician
George Edward Woodberry (1872) – poet and literary critic
Melville Bull (1873) – Lieutenant Governor of Rhode Island; U.S. representative from Rhode Island
Henry G. Danforth (1873) – U.S. representative from New York
Robert O. Harris (1873) – U.S. representative from Massachusetts
James Cameron Mackenzie (1873) – transformative headmaster of Lawrenceville School
George Arthur Plimpton (1873) – publisher and philanthropist
William Bancroft (1874) – businessman; brigadier general; Mayor of Cambridge, Massachusetts
Benjamin Newhall Johnson (1874) – attorney, historian, owner of Breakheart Hill Forest
Ogden Mills (1874) – financier; owner of thoroughbreds; philanthropist
Guy Carleton Phinney (1874) – real estate developer
Frederick Winslow Taylor (1874) – efficiency innovator; management theorist and consultant; president of the American Society of Mechanical Engineers
Harlan P. Amen (1875) – principal of Phillips Exeter, 1895–1913
William De Witt Hyde (1875) – president of Bowdoin College
Henry Shute (1875) – author
William Morton Grinnell (1876) – lawyer; banker; diplomat; Third Assistant Secretary of State 
Robert Winsor (1876) – financier, investment banker, and philanthropist
Timothy L. Woodruff (1876) – Lieutenant Governor of New York
H. H. Holmes (1877?) – American serial killer
Charles MacVeagh (1877) – U.S. Ambassador to Japan 
William W. Stickney (1877) – Governor of Vermont
Willard S. Augsbury (1878) – businessman, banker, and politician from New York State
Sherman Hoar (1878) – U.S. representative from Massachusetts
Walter I. McCoy (1878) – U.S. representative from New Jersey
William Schaus (1878) – entomologist
Henry Grier Bryant (1879) – explorer, writer
S. Percy Hooker (1879) – politician from New York State
Moses King (1879) – editor and publisher of travel guidebooks
Francis S. Peabody (1879) – coal baron, ally of Adlai Stevenson

1880s

Joseph Adna Hill (1881) – statistician; devised the method of equal proportions
Thomas Parker Sanborn (1881) – poet; inspiration for the protagonist of Santayana's The Last Pilgrim
Charles Augustus Strong (1881) – philosopher and psychologist
William Woodward Baldwin (1882) – Third Assistant Secretary of State
Frank G. Higgins (1882) – football player, lawyer, politician, Lieutenant Governor of Montana
Edmund Wilson Sr. (1882) – Attorney General of New Jersey
Gordon Woodbury (1882) – U.S. Assistant Secretary of the Navy
Joseph H. Walker (1883) – Speaker of the Massachusetts House of Representatives
Larz Anderson (1884) – businessman, diplomat, U.S. Ambassador to Japan
Lindley Miller Garrison (1884) – U.S. Secretary of War
William Mann Irvine (1884) – academic, founding headmaster of Mercersburg Academy
Wallace Nutting (1884) – photographer
Bradley Palmer (1884) – attorney, businessman, philanthropist, part of American delegation to the Paris Peace Conference
John Scammon (1884) – president of the New Hampshire State Senate; associate justice of the New Hampshire Superior Court
James D. Denegre (1885) - Minnesota state senator and lawyer
William A. Chanler (1885) – explorer, soldier, U.S. representative from New York
Morton D. Hull (1885) – U.S. representative from Illinois
George Hunter (1885) – authority on decorative art
Walter W. Magee (1885) – U.S. representative from New York
Gifford Pinchot (1885) – first Chief Forester of the U.S. Forest Service; Governor of Pennsylvania
George Rublee (1885) – diplomat, advisor to Woodrow Wilson
Amos Alonzo Stagg (1885) – All-American football player; won national championships as Football Coach at U. of Chicago; "grandfather of football"
Augustus Noble Hand (1886) – federal judge
Tim Shinnick (1886) – professional baseball player: second baseman for the Louisville Colonels
William Wurtenburg (1886) – played on two national championship football teams at Yale; football coach at Navy and Dartmouth; physician 
Theodore Davis Boal (1887) – U.S. Army colonel; architect
Bob Huntington (1887) – U.S. Open Tennis Doubles champion (1891, 1892); architect
James Madison Morton Jr. (1887) – federal judge
George Higgins Moses (1887) – U.S. senator from New Hampshire, ambassador to Greece
Curtis Hidden Page (1887) – scholar, author, translator
William Rhode (1887) – All-American football player; won national championship as football coach at Yale
Frank Barbour (1888) – football player; football coach at the University of Michigan, businessman
John Cranston (1888) – All-American football player; football coach at Harvard University
Robert Boal Fort (1888) – Illinois politician
Thomas Lamont (1888) – partner and chairman of board of directors of J.P. Morgan & Co.
Lee McClung (1888) – All-American football player; Treasurer of the United States
Horace Tracy Pitkin (1888) – missionary beheaded during Boxer Rebellion
Frank St. John Sidway (1888) – New York State politician
Samuel Washington Weis (1888) – painter
Robert D. Farquhar (1889) – architect
Ogden H. Hammond (1889) – U.S. Ambassador to Spain
Booth Tarkington (1889) – Pulitzer Prize winner

1890s

Butler Ames (1890) – U.S. representative from Massachusetts
Carroll Bond (1890) – chief judge of the Supreme Court of the U.S. State of Maryland, the Court of Appeals
Henry M. Crane (1891) – automotive engineer and pioneer
George Lawrence Day (1890) – a.k.a. John Mapes Adams, Medal of Honor recipient (Boxer Rebellion)
Marshall Newell (1890) – All-American football player; football coach at Cornell University
Lewis Stevenson (1890) – son of Vice President Adlai Stevenson; Democratic Party leader; Illinois Secretary of State
William Boyce Thompson (1890) – mining engineer, financier, philanthropist
Julian Coolidge (1891) – mathematician; president of the Mathematical Association of America
Louis W. Hill (1891) – railroad magnate
John Howland (1891) – pediatrician
Henry McKee Minton (1891) – physician, co-founder of Sigma Pi Phi
Winfred Thaxter Denison (1892) – Secretary of the Interior of the Philippines
Daniel Gregory Mason (1892) – composer, music critic
Hiland Orlando Stickney (1892) – football coach at University of Wisconsin and Oregon State University
Charles Loring (1893) – Chief Justice of the Minnesota Supreme Court
William Belmont Parker (1893) – author and editor
Carl Frelinghuysen Gould (1894) – architect
Lawrence B. Hamlin (1895) – purveyor of Hamlin's Wizard Oil, fined for false advertising
George R. Stobbs (1895) – U.S. representative from Massachusetts
Charles R. Forbes (1896) – director of the Veterans' Bureau
Walter Dearborn (1897) – experimental psychologist; specialist in reading education
William F. Donovan (1897) – athletic ringer; football coach at Harvard University
Burt Z. Kasson (1897) – politician from New York State
Roscoe Conkling Bruce (1898) – educator
Robert William Sawyer (1898) – journalist, conservationist
Samuel Davis Wilson (1898) – Mayor of Philadelphia
Barry Faulkner (1899) – muralist
Robert Leavitt (1899) – Olympic gold medalist, 110m hurdles
Charles M. Olmsted (1899) – aeronautical engineer

1900s

Arthur Nash (1900) – architect
Myron E. Witham (1900) – All-American football player; football coach at Purdue and the University of Colorado
Swinburne Hale (1901) – civil rights attorney; a founder of the American Civil Liberties Union; poet
James Hogan (1901) – All-American football player
Walter Nelles (1901) – a founder of the American Civil Liberties Union
Foster Rockwell (1901) – All-American football player; football coach at Yale and Navy; won national championship coaching at Yale; hotelier
Ralph B. Strassburger (1901) – businessman, thoroughbred owner and breeder
Joseph Gilman (1902) – All-American football player, businessman
Samuel M. Harrington (1902) – brigadier general
J. W. Knibbs (1902) – football player; football coach at University of California, Berkeley
James Cooney (1903) – All-American football player
Sterling Dow (1903) – American classical archaeologist and epigrapher
Nicholas V. V. Franchot II (1903) – businessman and New York State politician
Hugo W. Koehler (1903) – U.S. Navy commander; military attaché to Russia
Samuel Abraham Marx (1903) – architect and interior designer
Jay R. Benton (1904) – Massachusetts Attorney General
Edwin F. Harding (1904) – U.S. Army major general, commander of 32nd Infantry Division during WW II
Howard Jones (1904) – football coach; won national championships coaching Yale and USC
T. A. Dwight Jones (1904) – All-American football player; Yale football coach
Jim McCormick (1904) – All-American football player; football coach at Princeton
F. Harold Van Orman (1904) – Lieutenant Governor of Indiana 
Harrie B. Chase (1905) – federal judge
Richard Grozier (1905) – owner, publisher, and editor of The Boston Post; responsible for exposing Charles Ponzi 
Roger Sherman Hoar (1905) – lawyer, politician, science fiction author
William Rand (1905) – Olympic athlete (1908, 110m hurdles)
Thomas C. Coffin (1906) – U.S. representative from Idaho
Haniel Long (1906) – poet, novelist, publisher and academic
Henry Morgenthau Jr. (1906) – U.S. Secretary of Treasury under Franklin D. Roosevelt (did not graduate)
Andrew Tombes (1906) – comedian and character actor
Justin Woodward Harding (c. 1907) – federal judge; trial judge at Nuremberg
Ed Wheelan (1907) – cartoonist
Robert Benchley (1908) – author; member of original staff of The New Yorker; actor
Frank M. Dixon (c. 1908) – Governor of Alabama; a founder of the States' Rights Party ("Dixiecrats")
Arthur Bluethenthal (1909) – All-American football player; decorated World War I pilot
Walter William Spencer Cook (c. 1909) – Spanish Medieval art historian and professor 
John Paul Jones – Olympic runner and baseball player (1912); world record holder in the mile run

1910s

Wayne G. Borah (1910) – federal judge
J. Ira Courtney (1910) – Olympic sprinter and baseball player (1912)
Allen Dulles (1910) – U.S. Director of Central Intelligence
Rustin McIntosh (1910) – pediatrician
Edwin Charles Parsons (1910) – Rear Admiral of the United States Navy
Olin M. Jeffords (1911) – Chief Justice of the Vermont Supreme Court
Robert Nathan (1912) – novelist and poet
Phelps Putnam (1912) – poet
Donald Ogden Stewart (1912) – Academy Award-winning screenwriter, The Philadelphia Story
Harold Weston (1912) – modernist painter
William D. Byron (1913) – U.S. representative from Maryland
Harry Worthington (1913) – Olympic long jumper (1912)
John Amen (1914) – prosecutor of government corruption, head of the U.S. Interrogation Division at the Nuremberg Trials
Arthur Freed (1914) – film producer
Howard Hawks (1914) – film director
Joseph Frank Wehner (1914) – fighter pilot
Charles Bierer Wrightsman (c. 1914) – fine arts collector and philanthropist
Art Braman (1915) - NFL football player
Eddie Casey (1915) – All-American football player; head coach of the Washington Redskins
Richard F. Cleveland (1915) – son of President Grover Cleveland; civil servant
Lawrence Dennis (1915) – author and economist
Louis M. Loeb (1915) – president of the New York City Bar Association
Drew Pearson (1915) – newspaper reporter, author, columnist
Stephen Potter (1915) – first American naval aviator to shoot down a German seaplane
John Cowles Sr. (1917) – co-owner of the Cowles Media Company
Frederick Cunningham (1917) – Olympic fencer (1920)
Werner Janssen (1917) – conductor and composer
Donold Lourie (1917) – All-American football player; businessman; government official
Frederick James Woodbridge (1917) – architect
Robert B. Chiperfield (1918) – U.S. representative from Illinois
George H. Love (1918) – businessman; industrialist; coal baron; chairman of the board of Chrysler
Francis T. P. Plimpton (1918) – lawyer and diplomat
Norris Cotton (1919) – U.S. representative from New Hampshire; U.S. senator from New Hampshire
Haddie Gill (1919) – pitcher for Cincinnati Reds
David Granger (1919) – Olympic bobsledder (1928–silver medal)
Donald Oenslager (1919) – Tony Award-winning scenic designer
Phra Bisal Sukhumvit (1919) – Thai chief of Department of Highways, urban planner

1920s

James Tinkham Babb (1920) – librarian and book collector
Mark Brunswick (c. 1920) – composer
Corliss Lamont (1920) – humanist and civil libertarian
Jess Sweetser (1920) – amateur golfer
Herb Treat (1920) – All-American football player; player-coach of the Boston Bulldogs
C. Bradford Welles (1920) – classicist
James Greenway (1921) – ornithologist
Richard Luman (1921) – All-American football player; Speaker of the Wyoming House of Representatives
Laurence Stoddard (1921) – Olympic coxswain (1924–gold medal)
Weston Adams (c. 1922) – principal owner and president of the Boston Bruins
Montgomery Atwater (1922) – pioneer in avalanche research and forecasting; author
Robert Todd Lincoln Beckwith (1922) – great-grandson of Abraham Lincoln
Bayes Norton (1922) – Olympic sprint runner (1924)
Laurence Duggan (1923) – head of the South American desk at the United States Department of State; Soviet spy
Jarvis Hunt (c. 1923) – 79th president of Massachusetts Senate
Charles Edward Wyzanski Jr. (1923) – federal judge
John Chase (1924) – Olympic ice hockey player (1932–silver medal)
Howard Francis Corcoran (1924) – federal judge
Sidney Darlington (1924) – engineer and inventor; winner of the Presidential Medal of Freedom
John F. "Jack" Hasey (1924) – officer in the French Foreign Legion; C.I.A. officer; officer in the Légion d'honneur
Tracy Jaeckel (1924) – Olympic fencer (1932–bronze medal, 1936)
George E. Kimball (1924) – professor of quantum chemistry
John H. H. Phipps (1924) – businessman, conservationist, philanthropist, champion polo player
William Saltonstall (1924) – principal of Phillips Exeter, 1946–1963
Edmund Berkeley (1925) – computer scientist; author
John K. Fairbank (1925) – academic and historian of China
Lincoln Kirstein (1925) – writer; co-founder and general director of the New York City Ballet (did not graduate)
Dwight Macdonald (1925) – author and critic
Richard B. Sewall (1925) – Yale English professor; biographer
Kent Smith (c. 1925) – actor
Walworth Barbour (1926) – U.S. Ambassador to Israel
Walter A. Brown (1926) – original owner of the Boston Celtics, owner of the Boston Bruins
Richard W. Leopold (1926) – historian at Northwestern University 
Red Rolfe (1927) – All-Star New York Yankee third baseman, manager of the Detroit Tigers
James Agee (1928) – author and critic
Morton Bartlett (1928) – sculptor and photographer
Jack R. Howard (1928) – broadcasting executive
Albert E. Kahn (1928) – blacklisted journalist and photographer
Tex McCrary (1928) – journalist, radio and television talk-show innovator, political "fixer"
Hart Day Leavitt (1928) – longtime English teacher, Phillips Academy, Andover, Massachusetts
Hickman Price (1928) – business executive; U.S. Assistant Secretary of Commerce 
Paul Sweezy (1928) – economist and publisher
Whiting Willauer (1928) – U.S. Ambassador to Honduras and Costa Rica
Robert H. Bates (1929) – instructor in English, PEA; mountaineer
H. Hamilton "Hammy" Bissell (1929) – long-time director of scholarships at the academy; uncle of John Irving (1961)
Edwin Gillette (1929) – cameraman, inventor of animation technique
Sam Knox (c. 1929) – guard for the Detroit Lions
William Ernest Gillespie (1929) – interim principal of Phillips Exeter Academy
William Howard Stein (1929) – Nobel Prize winner in Chemistry, 1972
Henry Babcock Veatch (1929) – neo-Aristotelian philosopher

1930s

Joseph H. Burchenal (1930) – oncologist; winner of the Lasker Award
John A. M. Hinsman (1930) – president of the Vermont State Senate
Francis Spain (1930) – captain of the 1936 U.S. Olympic hockey team (bronze medal)
Eliot Butler Willauer (1930) – architect
Larry Bogart (1931) – critic of nuclear power
Macdonald Carey (1931) – film and television actor, winner of two Emmy Awards
John Crosby (1931) – newspaper columnist, media critic, suspense novelist
George Haskins (1931) – law professor at the University of Pennsylvania Law School
Richard S. Salant (1931) – president of CBS News
Sonny Tufts (1931) – film and television actor
Bruce H. Billings (1932) – physicist
Richard Pike Bissell (1932) – author and playwright, winner of Tony Award (The Pajama Game)
 Germain Glidden (1932) – national squash champion, painter, muralist, cartoonist and founder of the National Art Museum of Sport
Milton Green (1932) – world record holder in the high hurdles; boycotted 1936 Olympics
John Toland (1932) – Pulitzer Prize-winning historian (The Rising Sun) 
Adolph Coors III (1933) – businessman
Richard Dorson (1933) – "father of American folklore"
Arthur M. Schlesinger Jr. (1933) – historian
Charles E. Tuttle (1933) – publisher
Robert Livingston Allen (1934) – linguist, developer of Sector Analysis
Nathaniel Benchley (1934) – author, screenwriter
William H. Blanchard (1934) – four-star general, Vice Chief of Staff of the United States Air Force
Richard Walker Bolling (c. 1934) – U.S. representative from Missouri (did not graduate)
William Coors (c. 1934) – CEO, Coors Brewing Company
Gordon Kay (1934) – movie producer
Thomas P. Whitney (1934) – diplomat, author, translator, philanthropist
Robert W. Anderson (1935) – playwright
Elkan Blout (1935) – inventor; biochemist; awarded National Medal of Science
R. W. B. Lewis (1935) – literary scholar and critic
Tom Slick (c. 1935) – inventor and businessman
Joseph Coors (1935) – CEO, Coors Brewing Company
David D. Furman (1935) – New Jersey Attorney General, New Jersey Superior Court judge
Hugh Gregg (1935) – Governor of New Hampshire, father of Senator Judd Gregg (1965)
David Hall (c. 1935) – recorded sound archivist
William Verity Jr. (c. 1935) – U.S. Secretary of Commerce
James T. Aubrey (c. 1936) – president of CBS and MGM
Alfred D. Chandler Jr. (1936) – business historian
Thomas Clinton (1936) – executive of Deutsche Bank, philanthropist, early advocate of the formation of the Presbyterian Church
Calvin Plimpton (1936) – physician, president of Amherst College
George M. Prince (c. 1936) – co-creator of synectics
Robert Samuel Salzer (1936) – Vice Admiral of the United States Navy
John Tyler Bonner (c. 1937) – biologist
Lee Parsons Gagliardi (1937) – federal judge
Nelson Gidding (1937) – screenwriter
Douglas Knight (1937) – president of Duke University
Alfred A. Knopf Jr. (1937) – co-founder of Atheneum Publishers
Daniel E. Koshland Jr. (1937) – biochemist; editor of Science
Charles Mergendahl (1937) – novelist, playwright, television scriptwriter
Robert H. B. Baldwin (1938) – Undersecretary of the Navy; chairman and president of Morgan Stanley
Lex Barker (1938) – actor
T. Clark Hull (1938) – Lieutenant Governor of Connecticut; Connecticut Supreme Court justice
Nicholas Katzenbach (1938) – U.S. Attorney General; vice-president of IBM; father of John Katzenbach (1968)
Alexander Saxton (c. 1938) – historian, novelist, and university professor
Arthur A. Seeligson Jr. (1938) – oilman, rancher, thoroughbred racehorse owner and breeder
Sloan Wilson (1938) – author (did not graduate)
Forman S. Acton (1939) – computer scientist
Alfred Atherton (1939) – U.S. Ambassador to Egypt
Ward Chamberlin (1939) – public broadcasting executive
John Holt (1939) – educational critic, activist, and author

1940s

George Christopher Archibald (1940) – British economist
William J. Conklin (c. 1940) – architect, archeologist; designer of United States Navy Memorial, co-designer of Reston, Virginia
Lloyd L. Duxbury (c. 1940) – Speaker of the Minnesota House of Representatives
Burke Marshall (1940) – U.S. Assistant Attorney General; head of the Civil Rights Division of the United States Department of Justice during the Civil Rights Era
Bud Palmer (1940) – professional basketball player (NY Knicks); jump shot pioneer; sportscaster; New York City Commissioner of Public Events
Lloyd Shapley (1940) – winner of the 2012 Nobel Prize in Economics
Harold R. Tyler Jr. (1940) – federal judge
William C. Campbell (1941) – two-time president of the USGA; member of the World Golf Hall of Fame
Neil MacNeil (1941) – journalist
Anton Myrer (1941) – author of war novels
Robert B. Choate Jr. (1942) – businessman and political activist
Nathaniel Davis (1942) – career diplomat, U.S. Ambassador to Guatemala, Chile, and Switzerland 
William Bell Dinsmoor Jr. (1942) – classical archaeologist and architectural historian
Thomas Ashley Graves Jr. (1942) – president of the College of William & Mary
Lloyd Stephen Riford Jr. (1942) – New York State politician
Bagley Wright (1942) – developer; investor; arts patron and fine art collector
John G. King (1943) – physicist
Roberts Bishop Owen (1943) – U.S. State Department legal advisor and diplomat
Robert B. Rheault (1943) – U.S. military officer; conspirator in the Green Beret Affair; inspiration for Apocalypse Now
Frederic M. Richards (1943) – biochemist and biophysicist
Julian Roosevelt (1943) – Olympic sailor (1948, 1952–gold medal, 1956, 1960, 1968, 1972)
Roger Sonnabend (1943) – hotelier and businessman
John Thomson (1943) – UK High Commissioner to India; UK Ambassador to the UN
Gore Vidal (1943) – author
Whitney Balliett (1944) – writer for The New Yorker
Willis Barnstone (1944) – poet, memoirist, translator
Robinson O. Everett (1944) – judge and law professor
Kenneth W. Ford (1944) – physicist
George Plimpton (1944) – author, editor, journalist, actor (expelled)
Henry N. Cobb (1944) – architect and founding partner of Pei Cobb Freed & Partners
John Glenn Beall Jr. (1945) – U.S. representative from Maryland; U.S. senator from Maryland
 James P. Gordon (1945) – invented the Maser as a graduate student at Columbia University with Charles H. Townes (who was later awarded the Nobel Physics prize in 1964)
Fred Kingsbury (1945) – Olympic rower (1948–bronze medal)
John Knowles (1945) – author, A Separate Peace
James R. Lilley (1945) – U.S. Ambassador to China
William E. Schluter – New Jersey politician
Charles W. Bailey II (1946) – political reporter, newspaper editor, political novelist (Seven Days in May)
Theodore V. Buttrey Jr. (1946) – numismatist
Michael Forrestal (1946) – government aide, legal advisor
Will Holt (c. 1946) – singer, songwriter, librettist, lyricist
Ramsay MacMullen (1946) – professor of history at Yale University
Wallace Nutting (1946) – four-star general
F. D. Reeve (1946) – author, poet, translator, editor
Cervin Robinson (1946) – architectural photographer
Robert L. Belknap (c. 1947) – scholar of Russian literature and dean at Columbia University
John Cowles Jr. (1947) – newspaper editor and publisher; philanthropist
Bill Felstiner (1947) – socio-legal scholar
Donald Hall (1947) – poet; U.S. Poet Laureate, 2006–2007
Richard W. Murphy (1947) – diplomat; U.S. Ambassador to Mauritania, Syria, the Philippines, and Saudi Arabia 
Glenn D. Paige (1947) – political scientist
John Pittenger (c. 1947) – lawyer and academic
Haviland Smith (1947) – C.I.A. station chief
Herbert P. Wilkins (1947) – Chief Justice of the Massachusetts Supreme Judicial Court
David Bevington (1948) – literary scholar
Douglas M. Head (1948) – Attorney General of Minnesota
Frederic B. Ingram (1948) – businessman
Alan Trustman (1948) – screenwriter (The Thomas Crown Affair, Bullitt, They Call Me Mr. Tibbs)
Don Whiston (1948) – Olympic ice hockey player (1952–silver medal)
Carlos Romero Barceló (1949) – Governor of Puerto Rico, Resident Commissioner of Puerto Rico to the U.S. House of Representatives
Adair Dyer (1949) – attorney, passed the International Family Law through the Supreme Court
Bo Goldman (1949) – screenwriter (One Flew Over the Cuckoo's Nest, Scent of a Woman), winner of two Academy Awards
Albert L. Hopkins (1949) – computer designer
Thomas P. Hoving (1949) – museum director, author, publisher (expelled; graduated from Hotchkiss School)
John Kerr (1949) – actor
James Smith (1949) – Olympic sport shooter (1956)

1950s

Bill Briggs (1950) – "Father of Extreme Skiing;" member U.S. National Ski and Snowboard Hall of Fame
Tom Corcoran (1950) – Olympic alpine skier (1956, 1960); four-time U.S. national champion alpine skier
M. Scott Peck (c. 1951) – psychiatrist; author (did not graduate)
George Eman Vaillant (1951) – psychiatrist 
Walter Darby Bannard (1952) – abstract painter and University of Miami professor
Robert Cowley (1952) – military historian
Pierre S. du Pont IV (1952) – U.S. representative from Delaware, Governor of Delaware
Thomas Ehrlich (1952) – president of Indiana University
Cyrus Hamlin (1952) – literary critic and theorist
Harmon Elwood Kirby (1952) – career diplomat; ambassador to Togo
Karl Ludvigsen (1952) – automotive journalist, author, historian, and design consultant
David Mumford (1952) – mathematician; winner of the Fields Medal; Macarthur Fellow
Robert D. Richardson (1952) – historian and biographer
Harold Russell Scott Jr. (1952) – Broadway actor and director 
David Wight (1952) – Olympic rower (1956–gold medal)
Robert G. Wilmers (1952) – businessman
Richard S. Arnold (1953) – judge of the United States Court of Appeals for the Eighth Circuit; namesake of federal courthouse in Little Rock
Hodding Carter III (1953) – Assistant Secretary of State for Public Affairs
Michael von Clemm (1953) – businessman, restaurateur, anthropologist
Bud Konheim (1953) – businessman
Earl J. Silbert (1953) – prosecutor in Watergate case
Robert C. Wetenhall (1953) – owner of the Montreal Alouettes football club
Jonathan Aldrich (1954) – poet
William Becklean (1954) – Olympic rower (1956–gold medal)
Peter B. Bensinger (1954) – administrator of the Drug Enforcement Administration
T. Alan Broughton (1954) – poet
Michael Z. Hobson (c. 1954) – executive vice president of Marvel Comics
James F. Hoge Jr. (1954) – editor of Foreign Affairs
Christopher Jencks (1954) – sociologist
David Merwin (1954) – Olympic sprint canoer (1956)
Robert Morey (1954) – Olympic rower (1956–gold medal)
George Beall (1955)– prosecutor of Vice President Spiro Agnew
G. Bradford Cook (1955) – chairman of the U.S. Securities and Exchange Commission
Charles D. Ellis (1955) – investment consultant; author; founder of Greenwich Associates
John Gager (1955) – professor of religion at Princeton University
Richard Maltby Jr. (1955) – theater producer, director, and lyricist; screenwriter; crossword puzzle creator
John D. "Jay" Rockefeller IV (1955) – Governor of West Virginia; U.S. Senator from West Virginia
Peter Sears (1955) – Poet Laureate of Oregon
Tom Whedon (1955) – television screenwriter
Phil Wilson (c. 1955) – jazz trombonist
Gordon Park Baker (1956) – American-English philosopher
William Bayer (1956) – crime fiction writer
Stewart Brand (1956) – editor, author, Internet pioneer
H. John Heinz III (1956) – U.S. representative from Pennsylvania; U.S. senator from Pennsylvania
Dennis Johnson (1956) – composer, mathematician
J. Vinton Lawrence (1956) – C.I.A. operative; caricaturist
Theodore Stebbins (1956) – art historian
John Negroponte (1956) – U.S. Ambassador to Honduras, Mexico, the Philippines, United Nations, and Iraq; U.S. Deputy Secretary of State, the first Director of National Intelligence
Peter Benchley (1957) – journalist, presidential speechwriter, author, screenwriter (Jaws)
Peter Georgescu (1957) – author, chairman emeritus of Young & Rubicam
Bill Keith (1957) – banjo innovator
Herbert Kohler Jr. (1957) – businessman (did not graduate)
Terry Lenzner (1957) – lawyer
Jack McCarthy (1957) – writer and slam poet
Tim Wirth (1957) – U.S. representative from Colorado; U.S. senator from Colorado; current head of the United Nations Foundation
John Winslow Bissell (1958) – judge for the United States District Court for the District of New Jersey
Don Briscoe (1958) – television actor
George Gilder (1958) – writer and co-founder of the Discovery Institute
Warren Hoge (1958) – reporter, bureau chief, and editor at The New York Times (did not graduate)
David Lamb (1958) – reporter, bureau chief at The Los Angeles Times (did not graduate)
George de Menil (1958) – French economist
Stephen Robert (1958) – philanthropist and businessman, CEO of Oppenheimer & Co
Robert Thurman (1958) – first American to be ordained a Buddhist monk in 1964; leading expert on Tibetan Buddhism
John M. Walker Jr. (1958) – chief judge of the U.S. Court of Appeals for the Second Circuit
David M. Eddy (1959) – physician
David Rockefeller Jr. (1959) – philanthropist and businessman, descendant of John D. Rockefeller
Morris S. Arnold (1959) – judge on the United States Court of Appeals for the Eighth Circuit
Daniel Dennett (1959) – philosopher
Charles Janeway (1959) – immunologist
Tom Mankiewicz (1959) – screenwriter, director, producer
Hayford Peirce (1959) – writer
Benno C. Schmidt Jr. (1959) – educator, president of Yale University

1960s

Alvin P. Adams, Jr. (1960) – ambassador to Peru, Haiti, and Djibouti
Robert Mehrabian (c. 1960) – materials scientist 
Charles Horman (1960) – journalist, victim of Chilean coup
Charles C. Krulak (1960) – 31st Commandant of the U.S. Marine Corps
Jerrold Speers (1960) – Maine State Treasurer
John Irving (1961) – author, The World According to Garp
George W. S. Trow (1961) – novelist, playwright, short story writer, longtime contributor to The New Yorker
Peter Simon (c. 1961) – actor
Robert F. Wagner Jr. (1961) – deputy mayor of New York City; president of the New York City Board of Education
Arthur K. Wheelock Jr. (1961) – curator of the Northern European Art Collection at the National Gallery of Art
Kenneth Bacon (1962) – Department of Defense spokesman; president of Refugees International
Evan A. Davis (1962) – president of the New York City Bar Association
Chester E. Finn Jr. (1962) – educator; president of the Thomas B. Fordham Foundation
Larry Hough (1962) – Olympic rower (1968–silver medal, 1972)
Myron Magnet (1962) – conservative author, editor at large of City Journal
Gregory B. Craig (1963) – attorney; assistant Secretary of State; White House Counsel; defended President Clinton in impeachment trial 
Gordon Gahan (1963) – photographer
Craig Roberts Stapleton (1963) – U.S. Ambassador to France and Czech Republic
Willy Eisenhart (1964) – writer on art
Paul Magriel (1964) – professional backgammon and poker player; author 
Peter Coors (1965) – president, Adolph Coors Brewing Co.
David Darst (1965) – managing director, Morgan Stanley
Barry Golson (c. 1965) – editor, journalist, author
Terry Goddard (1965) – Attorney General of Arizona; Mayor of Phoenix
Judd Gregg (1965) – U.S. representative from New Hampshire; Governor of New Hampshire; U.S. senator from New Hampshire (withdrew as U.S. Commerce Secretary-designate)
Helmut Panke (1965) – president, Bayerische Motoren Werke AG (BMW)
Harrison "Skip" Pope Jr. (1965) – psychiatrist
Charlie Smith (1965) – poet, novelist
James Earl Coleman Jr. (1966) – attorney 
Kent Conrad (1966) – U.S. senator from North Dakota
David Eisenhower (1966) – grandson of Dwight D. Eisenhower, 34th president of the United States; namesake of the Camp David presidential retreat
Fred Grandy (1966) – actor; U.S. representative from Iowa; political commentator
Steven T. Kuykendall (1966) – U.S. representative from California
David Olney (1966) – folk singer/songwriter
Mark Ethridge (1967) – Pulitzer Prize-winning journalist; novelist; screenwriter; publisher
Jonathan Galassi (1967) – president and publisher of Farrar, Straus and Giroux; poet
Curt Hahn (1967) – filmmaker
Lawrence Lasker (1967) – producer and screenwriter of Sneakers
Frank Teruggi (1967) – journalist
Lincoln Caplan (1968) – author, journalist, Truman Capote Visiting Lecturer in Law and senior research scholar in law at Yale Law School
Geoffrey Biddle (1968) – photographer
Peter Galassi (1968) – curator
Tom Birmingham (1968) – president of the Massachusetts Senate
Edward Hallowell (1968) – psychiatrist
John Katzenbach (1968) – author; son of Nicholas Katzenbach (1938)
Thomas Lennon (filmmaker) (1968) – documentary filmmaker
Steve Mantis (1968) – Canadian politician
Michael Fossel (1968) – editor of the Journal of Anti-Ageing Medicine
Dowell Myers (1968) – professor
Anthony Davis (1969) – composer and jazz pianist
Peter W. Galbraith (1969) – diplomat, author, ambassador to Croatia (did not graduate)
John C. Harvey Jr. (1969) – Admiral, US Navy; Commander US Fleet Forces Command; Chief of Naval Personnel/Deputy Chief of Naval Operations
Christopher Kimball (1969) – founder of Cook's Illustrated;  host of America's Test Kitchen
Jack Gilpin (1969) – movie and television actor
John McTiernan (1969) – filmmaker

1970s

Robert Bauer (1970) – attorney, White House Counsel
Nicholas Callaway (1970) – publisher, television producer, writer, and photographer
Scott McConnell (1970) – journalist
Alex Beam (1971) – journalist, social critic
Joyce Maynard (1971) – author
Benmont Tench (1971) – musician and producer, keyboardist for Tom Petty
Roland Merullo (1971) – author
Banthoon Lamsam (1971) – banker
Eben Alexander (1972) – neurosurgeon and author
Howard Brookner (1972) – film director
Robert J. Fisher (1972) – former chairman of the board, Gap, Inc.
Shigehisa Kuriyama (1972) – historian of medicine 
Ned Lamont (1972) – businessman and politician; 89th Governor of Connecticut
W. Drake McFeely (1972) – chairman and president of W.W. Norton & Company
Thomas G. Osenton (1972) – author; president, CEO, and publisher of The Sporting News Publishing Company
Bobby Shriver (1972) – activist, attorney, journalist 
Eric Breindel (1973) – neoconservative writer, editorial page editor of the New York Post
Rusty Magee (1973) – comedian, actor and composer/lyricist
Paul Romer (1973) – chief economist of the World Bank, Nobel Prize winner in Economics, 2018
Clayton Spencer (1973) – president of Bates College
Paul Sullivan (1973) – pianist and composer
Emery Brown (1974) – neuroscientist and anesthesiologist
Andrew Holtz (1974) – journalist
Stephen Mandel (1974) – hedge fund manager 
William S. Fisher (1975) – businessman and investor
Alix M. Freedman (1975) – Pulitzer Prize-winning journalist
Laurie Hays (1975) – Pulitzer Prize-winning journalist
Joseph Lykken (1975) – physicist
John O. McGinnis (1975) – legal theorist
Brooks D. Simpson (1975) – author, historian
Tom Steyer (1975) – asset manager, philanthropist, environmentalist, American presidential candidate, 2020
Ronald Chen (1976) – dean of Rutgers law school and advocate general for the State of New Jersey
Charlie Hunter (1976) – artist
Anne Marden (1976) – Olympic rower (1984–silver medal, 1988–silver medal)
Ginna Sulcer Marston (1976) – advertising director for the Partnership for a Drug Free America
David McKean (1976) – author; U.S. Ambassador to Luxembourg 
Norb Vonnegut (1976) – author
James F. Conant (1977) – philosopher
James Rubin (1977) – former US Assistant Secretary of State for Public Affairs (Aug. 1997 – Apr. 2000)
James Somerville (1977) – minister, First Baptist Church (Richmond, Virginia); former minister of First Baptist Church of Washington, DC
Suzy Welch (1977) – journalist; author; former editor of Harvard Business Review; married to former GE CEO Jack Welch
Catherine Disher (1978) – actress
Mark Driscoll (1978) – Emmy Award-winning screenwriter
Michael Lynton (1978) – CEO of Sony Entertainment Inc.
Paul Villinski (1978) – sculptor (did not graduate)
Michael Cerveris (1979) – Broadway and movie actor; winner of two Tony Awards
John J. Fisher (1979) – majority owner of the Oakland Athletics
Chip Hourihan (1979) – independent film producer (Frozen River, Amateur) and director
Jonathan Smith (1979) – Olympic rower (1984–silver medal, 1984–bronze medal, 1992)
Andrew Sudduth (1979) – Olympic rower (1984–silver medal, 1988)
Hansen Clarke – U.S. representative from Michigan (did not graduate)
William J. "Billy" Ruane Jr. – Boston area music promoter (did not graduate)

1980s

 Ted Hope (1980) – independent film producer, including The Ice Storm and Happiness
Heather Cox Richardson (1980) – historian
 Greg Daniels (1981) – producer, including The Simpsons; adapted U.S. version of The Office from the BBC version; winner of four Emmy Awards
 Dave Douglas (1981) – jazz trumpeter and composer
 Pamela Erens (1981) – novelist
 Paul Klebnikov (1981) – journalist; murdered in Moscow
 Sarah Lyall (1981) – reporter, The New York Times
 Dan Brown (1982) – former instructor in English at Phillips Exeter Academy; bestselling author, The Da Vinci Code
 Kim McLarin (1982) – novelist
 Stephen Metcalf (1982) – critic-at-large and columnist at Slate magazine (did not graduate)
 Nancy Jo Sales (1982) – journalist; author
 Cosy Sheridan (1982) – folk singer and songwriter
 Gwynneth Coogan (1983) – Olympic athlete (10,000m, 1992)
 Adam Guettel (1983) – musical theater composer; composed The Light in the Piazza;  winner of six Tony Awards
 Chang-Rae Lee (1983) – author
Charles Cameron Ludington (1983) – historian
 Henry Blodget (1984) – editor and CEO of Business Insider
 Julie Livingston (1984) – public health historian, anthropologist, MacArthur Fellow
David Chipman (1984) – AFT Agent and gun control activist
Stephanie Stebich (1984) – director of the Smithsonian American Art Museum
Roland Tec (1984) – writer, director
 Vanessa Friedman (1985) – fashion critic
 Shinichi Mochizuki (1985) – mathematician
 Edmund Perry (1985) – African-American teenager shot and killed by NYPD officers; inspiration to Michael Jackson
 Maya Forbes (1986) – screenwriter and television producer
 David Folkenflik (1987) – National Public Radio reporter
 Christine Harper (1987) – chief financial correspondent at Bloomberg News
Tal Keinan (c. 1987) – Israeli entrepreneur, financier
 Kenji Yoshino (1987) – law school professor, author
 Peter Orszag (1987) – director of U.S. Office of Management & Budget under President Barack Obama
 China Forbes (1988) – musician (lead singer of Pink Martini)
 Claudine Gay (1988) – professor of Government and of African and African-American Studies, dean of Faculty of Arts and Sciences at Harvard University
 Niel Brandt (1988) – professor of astronomy and astrophysics at Pennsylvania State University
 (1989) – archaeologist, professor, documentary host
 David Goel (1989) – hedge fund manager
Jeff Locker (c. 1989) – actor
 Joon Kim (1989) – Acting U.S. Attorney for the Southern District of New York

1990s

Jon Bonné (1990) – journalist
Michael Crowley (1990) – journalist
Adrian Dearnell (1990) – Franco-American financial journalist; CEO and founder of EuroBusiness Media
Katherine Reynolds Lewis (1990) – author
Jeff Ma (1990) – part of MIT blackjack team, basis of the film 21 and the book Bringing Down the House by Ben Mezrich
Alessandro Nivola (1990) – actor
John Palfrey (1990) – educator, scholar, law professor, head of Phillips Academy of Andover
Brian Shactman (1990) – television news anchor
Jeff Wilner (1990) – tight end for the Green Bay Packers
Jonathan Orszag (1991) – economist
Trish Regan (1991) – television news anchor
Eunice Yoon (1991) – television new anchor
Roxane Gay (1992) – author
Jason Hall (1992) – screenwriter (American Sniper); director
Quentin Palfrey (1992) – lawyer, Lieutenant Governor of Massachusetts candidate, 2018
Jedediah Purdy (1992) – author, law school professor
Rajanya Shah (1992) – Olympic rower (2000)
Brandon Williams (1992) – basketball player 
Andrew Yang (1992) – entrepreneur, American presidential candidate, 2020
Gregory W. Brown (1993) – composer
John Forté (1993) – musician, recording artist, composer, music producer, educator, activist
Aomawa Shields (1993) – Astronomer, TED Fellow
Debby Herbenick (1994) – human sexuality expert
Drew Magary (1994) – journalist, humor columnist, and novelist
Alex Okosi (1994) – media executive
Philip Andelman (1995) – music video director
Sloan DuRoss (1995) – Olympic rower (2004)
Sarah Milkovich (1996) – planetary geologist, engineer
Ketch Secor (1996) – musician and vocalist, Old Crow Medicine Show
Hrishikesh Hirway (1996) – musician and vocalist; creator and host of Song Exploder
Tom Cochran (1996) – Obama administration official
Luke Bronin (1997) – Mayor of Hartford 
Zach Iscol (1997) – US Marine Corps veteran, entrepreneur, 2021 comptroller candidate for New York City
Susie Suh (1997) – musician
Win Butler (1998) – musician; lead singer of Arcade Fire
Joy Fahrenkrog (1998) – member of the United States Archery Team
Georgia Gould (1998) – Olympic mountain biker (2008, 2012–bronze medal)
Sabrina Kolker (1998) – Olympic rower (2004, 2008)
Mike Morrison (1998) – professional ice hockey player
Kirstin Valdez Quade (1998) – writer
Soce, the elemental wizard (c. 1998) – rapper and producer
Paul Yoon (1998) – novelist
Mike Blomquist (1999) – U.S. National Team (rowing); 2005 Men's 8+l gold medal at 2005 World Championships

2000s

Sam Fuld (2000) – Major League Baseball outfielder for the Chicago Cubs, Tampa Bay Rays, Minnesota Twins, and Oakland Athletics; general manager of the Philadelphia Phillies
William Butler (2001) – musician; multi-instrumentalist of Arcade Fire
Tom Cavanagh (2001) – National Hockey League player
Adam D'Angelo (2002) – founder of Quora, first Chief Technology Officer of Facebook
Heather Jackson (2002) – American triathlete and track cyclist, 
Andréanne Morin (2002) – Canadian Olympic rower (2004, 2008, 2012–bronze medal)
Mark Zuckerberg (2002) – founder of Facebook
Shani Boianjiu (2005) – author of The People of Forever Are Not Afraid
Nicholas la Cava (2005) – Olympic rower (2012)
Josh Owens (2007) – professional basketball player for Hapoel Tel Aviv of the Israeli Basketball Premier League
Erik Per Sullivan (2009) – actor; "Dewey" on Malcolm in the Middle

2010s
  Caroline Calloway (2010) – media personality
  Duncan Robinson (2013) – NBA player for the Miami Heat and former player for the Michigan Wolverines men's basketball team
  Nicole Heavirland (2014) – USA rugby player
Zhuo Qun Song (2015) – the most highly decorated International Mathematical Olympiad contestant, with five gold medals and one bronze medal
 Jacob Grandison, 2017, College Basketball player for Holy Cross and Illinois
   Rudi Ying (2017) – Supreme Hockey League hockey player

In fiction 
 2 Broke Girls – Caroline Channing, one of the two lead characters, delivered the line “All those who pitched business models to Warren Buffett as a member of the Phillips Exeter Entrepreneurs Club raise their hands. Holla!” in Season 1 Episode 7, "And the Pretty Problem".
 American Psycho – The narrator, Patrick Bateman, graduated in the class of 1980
 Dharma & Greg – Gregory Montgomery graduated from Exeter, Harvard, and Stanford Law.
 In Revere, in Those Days – This novel by Roland Merullo is about a boy who, instead of attending public school in his predominantly Italian town in Massachusetts, attends Exeter and plays hockey.
 Infinitely Polar Bear – Cam Stuart, the protagonist, played by Mark Ruffalo, claims to have been kicked out of both Exeter and Harvard.
 Love Story – Oliver Barrett IV attended Exeter.
 Marvel Comics – Warren Worthington III, aka Angel, attended Exeter as a child; he eventually sets up a scholarship at the school for "mutant kids". Later, X-Terminators members Boom-Boom, Rictor, and Skids also attend the school
 Robert Langdon – Robert Langdon, the main character, attended Exeter
The Prince of Tides – Herbert Woodruff, from the film and the novel of the same name, went to Exeter, as did his son (Bernard) in the book.
 The West Wing – Associate Supreme Court Justice candidate Peyton Cabot Harrison III attended Exeter
 Trading Places – Louis Winthorpe III attended Exeter

References

Further reading
Harris, Bernard C.; Phillips Exeter Academy Alumni-Alumnae, A Listing of the Trustees, Principals, Members of the Faculty Emeriti, and All Living Alumni and Alumnae ; Harris Publishing Company (White Plaines, New York), 19th Edition, PAH-W121-1M-18.1V

Phillips Exeter Academy alumni
Phillips Exeter Academy alumni
Phillips Exeter